Alice Callaghan (born circa 1947, Calgary, Alberta) is an Episcopalian priest and a former Roman Catholic nun.

An aggressive advocate of the homeless and impoverished people of downtown Los Angeles, she founded the SRO Housing Trust and is the manager of Las Familias del Pueblo, a Skid Row community center.

She has stated she wants to have Skid Row look like "a gentrified area for poor people", an attitude that has made her as many foes as friends. Some developers view the Skid Row area in Los Angeles as an opportunity to buy and rehabilitate aging buildings, convert them into condominiums and sell them at significant profits. Callaghan has insisted that the renovated buildings be used to house the poor.

Early years
Her family moved from Canada to southern California when she was a small child. Diminutive and athletic, she became a proficient surfer. She attended college and became a nun. She left the convent in order to become an Episcopalian priest. Seeing the grinding poverty of skid row, she decided to "make [herself] useful there."

References

1940s births
American Episcopal priests
Canadian emigrants to the United States
Converts to Anglicanism from Roman Catholicism
Homelessness activists
Living people
People from Calgary
20th-century American Roman Catholic nuns
21st-century American clergy